Reginald Alexander Douglas (born 19 April 1930) is a former New Zealand rower.

Douglas was born in Auckland on 19 April 1930. At the 1954 and 1958 British Empire and Commonwealth Games he twice won the gold medal in the men's coxless pair alongside Bob Parker. He also won the silver medal in the men's double sculls at the 1954 British Empire Games also partnering Parker.

Douglas and Parker also competed together at the 1956 Summer Olympics in Melbourne, finishing third in their semi-final in the coxless pair, missing out in a place in the final.

References

External links
 

1930 births
Living people
Rowers from Auckland
New Zealand male rowers
Olympic rowers of New Zealand
Rowers at the 1954 British Empire and Commonwealth Games
Rowers at the 1958 British Empire and Commonwealth Games
Rowers at the 1956 Summer Olympics
Commonwealth Games silver medallists for New Zealand
Commonwealth Games gold medallists for New Zealand
Commonwealth Games medallists in rowing
Medallists at the 1954 British Empire and Commonwealth Games
Medallists at the 1958 British Empire and Commonwealth Games